Jefferson is an unincorporated community and census-designated place (CDP) in Frederick County, Maryland, United States. As of the 2020 census the town had a population of 2,235 (which includes the widespread area of the town's zip code, not Jefferson proper). Jefferson was established in 1774 and incorporated as a town in 1831. However, a year later, in 1832, the citizens of the town decided that municipal government was unnecessary, and dis-incorporated the town, which has been unincorporated since then.

History
According to archaeologist Mary F. Barse, Jefferson was initially laid out in 1774 on a  tract owned by Mrs. Eleanor Medley, which was ultimately called "New Town". It contained 40 rectangular lots – 20 aligned on each side of what is now MD 180 – stretching between what are now Lander Road and Old Middletown Road. In 1795, 22 additional lots were platted by Elias Delashmutt on the western end of the original section, and called "New Freedom". In 1831 both sections were incorporated as "Jefferson" by the Maryland Legislature.

Jefferson's growth in the 19th century was due largely to its location on the main road between Frederick and Harpers Ferry, which is today's U.S. Route 340. Along this thoroughfare, wagon traffic and livestock drives were frequent. Concomitantly, commercial development intensified to serve the surrounding farms as well as travelers. As a center of agricultural mercantilism, throughout most of the late 18th and 19th century, Jefferson was also home to a sizable population of slaves.

The Hagerstown and Frederick Railway linked Jefferson to Frederick and Hagerstown in 1907. However, Maryland Route 180 remained the only link to the closest steam powered rail station in Brunswick.

Examined historic maps (Griffith 1795; Bond 1858; Martenet 1865, 1885; Lake 1873; USGS1910) depict Jefferson on what is now MD 180 as early as 1795. It was designated "Trap Town" at the close of the 18th century by Griffith (1795). Local history suggests that the name derives from the large number of taverns operating at the time, which were purportedly, on either ends of town. Consequently, a traveler could be "trapped" on their way in or out of town.

The Lewis Mill Complex and the George Willard House are National Register of Historic Places properties near Jefferson.

Geography
Jefferson is located in southwestern Frederick County at the western base of Catoctin Mountain. Maryland Route 180 passes through the town, and U.S. Route 340 bypasses it to the south, forming the southern edge of the CDP. US 340 leads northeast  to Frederick, the county seat, and southwest  to Harpers Ferry, West Virginia.

Demographics

References

External links

Jefferson community website

Census-designated places in Frederick County, Maryland
Census-designated places in Maryland
Populated places established in 1774
1774 establishments in Maryland